Blood Reviews is a quarterly peer-reviewed medical journal that publishes review articles in the field of hematology. It was established in 1987 and is published by Elsevier. The editors-in-chief are Hillard Lazarus (University Hospitals Case Medical Center) and Drew Provan (Royal London Hospital). According to the Journal Citation Reports, the journal has a 2017 impact factor of 6.600.

References

External links

Review journals
Quarterly journals
Hematology journals
Publications established in 1987
Elsevier academic journals
English-language journals